David Kipling Denton (born 5 February 1990) is a retired Zimbabwean-born Scottish rugby union player. He played in the back row, but could also play in the second row, and represented Edinburgh in the Pro12, Bath, Worcester Warriors and Leicester Tigers in England, and Scotland internationally.

Background
Denton was born in Zimbabwe, and qualified for Scotland as his mother was born in Glasgow. He attended Peterhouse Boys School in Zimbabwe, before moving to Kingswood College in the Eastern Cape in South Africa, where he made several appearances for Eastern Province in Port Elizabeth.

Club career
He moved to Edinburgh to study economics at the University of Edinburgh. While at university he played for Edinburgh Academicals. Although he struggled to begin with, playing in the 3rd XV for much of his first season, he advanced into the Accies' 2nd team, "TWAYS", under the tutelage of Malcolm McVie. He was brought into the Scotland under-20s set-up before playing for the Scottish National Academy. He was then awarded a professional contract at Edinburgh for the 2010–11 season.

His performances in his debut season lead him to being selected for Scotland's extended World Cup squad in the build-up to the showpiece. As well as his defensive capabilities, Denton is known to be an effective ball carrier due to his strength and agility (particularly for a man of his size — 1.96m and 119 kg).

In December 2013, Denton ended speculation about his future (which had seen him linked with a move to the Aviva Premiership) by signing a contract extension which saw him remain at Murrayfield until 2015.

On 10 November 2015, Denton signed for English club Bath Rugby who compete in the Aviva Premiership from the 2015–16 season.

On 30 May 2017, it was announced Denton would move from Bath to local rivals Worcester Warriors for the 2017-18 season. On 14 February 2018 Leicester Tigers announced the signing of Denton from Worcester for the 2018–19 season. Denton was forced to retire from rugby due to concussion in September 2019.

International career
Denton made his debut for Scotland, coming on off the bench in the 10–6 win over Ireland in the Rugby World Cup warm-up matches in August 2011. However, he was not named in the final squad for the tournament. He also appeared in all of Scotland's under-20 side's games in 2010, five games in the 2010 Six Nations Under 20s Championship and in the IRB Junior World Championship. He has appeared for the Scottish Sevens team in 2010 in the Dubai and George events.

Denton won the "man of the match" award, despite being on the losing side, in Scotland's 6–13 defeat to England in the opening game of the 6 Nations on 4 February 2012. Denton was "Man of the Match" in the 6 Nations match against France on 8 March 2014 despite being on the losing side. Following the announcement of the 6 Nations Squad for the 2018 tournament, Denton was recalled back into the team after a notable absence from the Scotland side since the summer tour of Japan in 2016.

References

External links
 Profile at edinburghrugby.org
 Profile at scotlandrugbyteam.org
 

1990 births
Living people
Scottish rugby union players
Zimbabwean people of Scottish descent
Scotland international rugby union players
Edinburgh Rugby players
Rugby union number eights
Zimbabwean emigrants to the United Kingdom
Zimbabwean rugby union players
Scotland international rugby sevens players
Male rugby sevens players
Leicester Tigers players
Alumni of Kingswood College (South Africa)